Probability plot, a graphical technique for comparing two data sets, may refer to:
P–P plot, "Probability-Probability" or "Percent-Percent" plot
Q–Q plot, "Quantile-Quantile" plot
Normal probability plot, a Q–Q plot against the standard normal distribution

See also
Probability plot correlation coefficient
Probability plot correlation coefficient plot